Rambler was launched at Whitby in 1792. She was a transport and West Indiaman, though she made a voyage to Smyrna before returning to the West Indies trade. She was condemned at Antigua in early 1808, having been damaged while sailing from Jamaica to London.

Career
Rambler first appeared in Lloyd's Register in 1795.<ref name=LR1795>[https://hdl.handle.net/2027/mdp.39015004281294?urlappend=%3Bseq=307 '"LR (1795), Seq.No.R266.]</ref>

In 1797 her ownership changed and her new owners moved her registration to London.

On 6 July 1799 Captain George Whytock acquired a letter of marque.

Fate
She had cut away her main and mizzen masts and was bearing away for the Western Island (the Azores). She was next reported to have put into Antigua. She was condemned there.

Her entry in the LR'' volume for 1809 carried the entry "condemned" by her name.

Citations and references
Citations

References
 

1792 ships
Ships built in Whitby
Age of Sail merchant ships of England
Maritime incidents in 1808